Hendrikus Andreas "Hennie" Kuiper (born 3 February 1949) is a Dutch former professional road racing cyclist. His career includes a gold medal in the Olympic road race at Munich in 1972, becoming world professional road race champion in 1975, as well as winning four of the five "Monument" classics. He rode the Tour de France 12 times, finishing second twice and winning the stage to Alpe d'Huez on two occasions. Kuiper, Ercole Baldini and Paolo Bettini are the only riders to have won both the Olympic road race and the world professional road race.

Biography
Kuiper was born in Denekamp, in Overijssel province. His serious introduction to the bicycle was to and from school in Enschede. He started participating in junior races from 14 and from 19 to 23 he won 39 times as an amateur. The climax of his amateur career was gold in the Olympic road race in Munich in 1972, riding the final 40 km alone. He also won the Tour of Britain (Milk Race) that year.

Professional career
Kuiper turned professional in 1973 with the small German team Haro-Rokado. His career took off in 1975 when he signed for the Dutch team, Frisol, where he got more chances to shine and formed a partnership with José De Cauwer (who worked for Kuiper in races) that lasted until 1980. The 1975 season saw Kuiper become world champion at Yvoir in Belgium, winning a tough race over 260 km, with 21 ascents of a  climb.

Kuiper signed for TI–Raleigh in 1976 and finished second in the  1977 Tour de France 48 seconds behind Bernard Thévenet, who later admitted using steroids. Kuiper won the mountain stage at Alpe d'Huez, a feat he repeated in 1978. Kuiper finished fourth in the 1979 Tour and second in 1980 behind fellow Dutchman Joop Zoetemelk. That second place ended his best years as a stage race rider and in 1981 he moved to DAF Trucks and reinvented himself as a one-day classics rider. 1981 saw him win the Tour of Flanders and the Giro di Lombardia while in 1983 he won Paris–Roubaix, his 11th attempt at the hell of the north. In 1985, at 36, he won Milan–San Remo. His retirement came on 6 November 1988 at 39 at a small cyclo-cross at Oldenzaal in his home province.

Team manager
After retirement Kuiper managed the small German pro squad Team Stuttgart between 1989 and 1990. In 1991 he became head of the Telekom team. In 1992 he was approached by Jim Ochowicz, manager of the American Motorola team, to become assistant team manager. Kuiper stayed with Motorola for four years. Since 1997 he has worked for the Rabobank team in public relations, as well as coaching the Dutch national team on occasions. He has two sons from his first marriage with Ine Nolten: Patrick Kuiper and Bjorn Kuiper. He lives with his second wife, Marianne, in Lonneker.

Career achievements

Major results

1970
 3rd Overall Tour of Yugoslavia
1st Stage 2
1971
 1st  Overall Circuit de Saône-et-Loire
 1st Stage 5 Tour of Yugoslavia
 1st Stage 1a Trois jours de Hénin Liétard
 3rd Overall Rheinland-Pfalz Rundfahrt
1st Stage 7
1972
 1st  Road race, Olympic Games
 1st  Overall Milk Race
 1st  Overall Ronde van Drenthe
 2nd Overall Tour du Limousin
 10th Overall Trophée Peugeot de l'Avenir
1973
 1st Stage 2 Tour de l'Aude
 2nd Züri-Metzgete
 4th Overall Tour de Luxembourg
 5th Amstel Gold Race
 10th Overall Volta a Catalunya
1974
 1st  Overall Tour d'Indre-et-Loire
 1st GP Union Dortmund
 2nd Paris–Camembert
 7th Overall Paris–Nice
 7th Overall Volta a Catalunya
 9th Züri-Metzgete
1975
 1st  Road race, UCI Road World Championships
 1st  Road race, National Road Championships
 2nd Grand Prix Le Télégramme de Brest
 2nd Kampioenschap van Vlaanderen
 3rd Trofeo Baracchi
 4th Overall Tour de Luxembourg
 5th Overall Vuelta a España
1st Stage 18
 7th Paris–Brussels
 9th Overall Tirreno–Adriatico
 9th Amstel Gold Race
 10th Overall Tour of the Netherlands
1976
 Tour de France
1st Stages 4 & 5a (TTT)
 2nd Overall Paris–Nice
 2nd Overall Vuelta a Andalucía
 2nd Omloop Het Volk
 2nd Paris–Brussels
 3rd Road race, National Road Championships
 4th Paris–Roubaix
 5th Liège–Bastogne–Liège
 5th Amstel Gold Race
 6th Overall Vuelta a España
1st Stage 4
 1st  Overall Tour de Suisse
1st Stage 3
 10th Overall Tour of the Netherlands
1977
 2nd Overall Tour de France
1st Stage 17
 2nd Overall Vuelta a Andalucía
 3rd Amstel Gold Race
 3rd Paris–Tours
 4th Road race, UCI Road World Championships
 6th Paris–Brussels
 4th Overall Four Days of Dunkirk
 8th Overall Tour de Luxembourg
 10th Paris–Roubaix
 10th Tour of Flanders
1978
 Tour de France
1st Stages 4 (TTT) & 16
 2nd Overall Tour de Romandie
 2nd Trofeo Baracchi
 3rd Rund um den Henninger Turm
 3rd Grand Prix des Nations
 4th Overall Tour de Suisse
 5th Overall Tour Méditerranéen
 5th Amstel Gold Race
 6th Liège–Bastogne–Liège
 6th Paris–Roubaix
 6th La Flèche Wallonne
 7th Overall Paris–Nice
 9th Overall Critérium du Dauphiné Libéré
1st Prologue
1979
 3rd Paris–Roubaix
 4th Overall Tour de France
 4th Overall Critérium National de la Route
 5th Overall Grand Prix du Midi Libre
 6th Grand Prix de Wallonie
 7th Overall Tour de l'Aude
 7th Tour of Flanders
 7th Grand Prix des Nations
 8th Overall Four Days of Dunkirk
 8th Overall Tour Méditerranéen
 9th La Flèche Wallonne
 10th Giro di Lombardia
 10th Gent–Wevelgem
1980
 2nd Overall Tour de France
 2nd Overall Tour d'Indre-et-Loire
 2nd Liège–Bastogne–Liège
 4th Overall Critérium du Dauphiné Libéré
 4th Paris–Brussels
 5th Overall Grand Prix du Midi Libre
 5th Giro di Lombardia
 7th La Flèche Wallonne
 7th Grand Prix de Wallonie
 8th Gent–Wevelgem
1981
 1st Giro di Lombardia
 1st Tour of Flanders
 2nd Overall Tour of the Netherlands
 6th Paris–Roubaix
 6th Giro dell'Emilia
 6th Nationale Sluitingsprijs
 7th E3 Prijs Vlaanderen
 8th Paris–Tours
 9th Rund um den Henninger Turm
1982
 1st Grand Prix de Wallonie
 2nd Overall Tour de Luxembourg
 2nd Trofeo Baracchi
 5th La Flèche Wallonne
 6th Amstel Gold Race
 6th Brabantse Pijl
 6th Paris–Tours
 7th Overall Paris–Nice
 8th Paris–Brussels
 9th Overall Tour de France
 10th Giro di Lombardia
1983
 1st Paris–Roubaix
 2nd Trofeo Baracchi
 4th Giro di Lombardia
 5th Overall Vuelta a España
 6th Liège–Bastogne–Liège
1984
 6th Grand Prix de Fourmies
 9th Paris–Roubaix
 10th Züri-Metzgete
1985
 1st Milan–San Remo
 3rd Tour of Flanders
 5th Bordeaux–Paris
 6th Kuurne–Brussels–Kuurne
 8th Paris–Roubaix
 10th Trofeo Laigueglia
1986
 10th E3 Prijs Vlaanderen
1987
 5th Rund um den Henninger Turm
1988
 3rd Veenendaal–Veenendaal Classic
 8th Grand Prix d'Ouverture La Marseillaise
 10th Overall Critérium International

Grand Tour general classification results timeline

DNF = Did Not Finish

See also
 List of Dutch Olympic cyclists

References

External links 

Official homepage of Hennie Kuiper
Official Flickr homepage of Hennie Kuiper

1949 births
Living people
People from Denekamp
Dutch male cyclists
Dutch Tour de France stage winners
UCI Road World Champions (elite men)
Cyclists at the 1972 Summer Olympics
Olympic cyclists of the Netherlands
Olympic gold medalists for the Netherlands
Olympic medalists in cycling
Dutch Vuelta a España stage winners
Tour de Suisse stage winners
Knights of the Order of Orange-Nassau
Medalists at the 1972 Summer Olympics
UCI Road World Championships cyclists for the Netherlands
Cyclists from Overijssel